Rahim Gul (1924 – 28 April 1985) was a famous Urdu language Pakistani writer, literary critic, author, film director and film producer. 

With various books of fiction, criticism, biography and art to his credit, Rahim Gul was a major figure in contemporary Urdu literature. He is best known for his last and the most widely read novel "Jannat Ki Talash".

Early life
Rahim Gul was born in Shakardara, Kohat, Khyber Pakhtunkhwa, Pakistan. He received his early ediucation from Kohat and joined British Army in 1941, then remained engaged in Burma fronts during the Second world war. Soon after the end of war, he left the army and settled in Lahore, Pakistan and started writing for various magazines and papers.

Career
Rahim Gul is the author of books and has been honored with Adamjee Literary Award on his book " Dastan Chour Aey". He wrote, directed and produced various Urdu and Pashto films. Before his death in 1985, he had been writing columns in Daily Jang, an Urdu language newspaper, for many years.

Death
Rahim Gul died on 28 April 1985 due to kidney failure at Sir Ganga Ram Hospital, Lahore.

Books
Woh Ajnabi Apna
Peyyas Ka Darya
Zehr Ka Darya
Dastan Chhor Aey (Biography) (Adamjee Award)
Tun Tara Ra
Jannat Ke Talash
Wadi e Gumaan Main
Khad o Khal
Portraits
Tarranum
Sarhadi Uqab

Filmography
 Lagan (1960) (Urdu)
 Habu (1961) (Urdu)
 Baarat (1963) (Urdu)
 Misal (1966) (Urdu)
 Ajab Khan Afridi (1971) (Pashto)
 Musa Khan Gul Makai (1971) (Pashto language)
 Ahtejaj (1979) (Urdu)
 Ahtjaj (1978) (Urdu)
 Rivaj (1979) (Pashto)

References

External links
 
Filmography of Rahim Gul on Complete Index To World Film (CITWF) website

1924 births
1985 deaths
People from Kohat District
Pakistani film directors
Pakistani film producers
Pakistani writers
Pashtun people
Recipients of the Adamjee Literary Award